Tjitunga Elijah Ngurare is a Namibian politician and academic at the University of Namibia who served as the Secretary General of the SWAPO Party Youth League from 2007 to 2015.

Early life and education
Elijah Ngurare was born on 28 October 1970 into a peasant family at Nkurenkuru during the South African Border War. His father had four wives and his mother was the youngest in the union. As a little boy, he looked after his father’s cattle and goats like all other boys at the time. He is the first born to his mother’s nine children.

Ngurare attended school at ELCIN Nkurenkuru High School, Linus Shashipapo Secondary School, Rundu Senior Secondary School, and Kolin Foundation Secondary School in Arandis, He then studied at the Central State University, Ohio (USA) with a presidential honours scholarship. He graduated magna cum laude with a Bachelor of Science degree in Water Resources Management and International Relations.

He then pursued a Master of Laws from the University of Dundee, Scotland, where he held a British Chevening Scholarship, and a PhD from the National University of Ireland, Cork in 2009.

Political career
Ngurare's political activeness began in 1983 at Nkurenkuru High School and continued at Linus Shashipapo Secondary School, where he was a student during the founding of the student movement Namibia National Students Organisation in 1984. He held various student positions and was active in Section, Branches and District Leadership of SWAPO Party Youth League. Ngurare rose to political prominence as Secretary of Information, Publicity and Mobilisation of the SWAPO Party Youth League (SPYL) under Paulus Kapia in 2002 before becoming its secretary general in 2007, and being subsequently re-elected in 2012.

Business career
In 2015 he lost his position as secretary-general and expelled from Swapo alongside Affirmative Repositioning founder Job Amupanda for "bringing the party's name into disrepute, and [..] insulting party leaders". He was reinstated as SWAPO member following a lengthy court process. He then joined the Ministry of Agriculture as Director for Rural Water Supply and Sanitation coordination in March 2020.

He served on the board of directors at Namdeb Diamond Corporation (Pty) Ltd, Namdeb Holdings (Pty) Ltd, Africa Online (Pty) Ltd, MultiChoice Namibia, Kalahari Holdings (Pty) Ltd and Namibia Water Corporation Ltd.

Personal life
Ngurare is married to Albertina Mbute Ngurare. They have four children. As a Christian, he is Lutheran by religion and an ardent church goer.

References

External links
Ngurare |NID Namibia Institute of Democracy
Official Twitter

1970 births
Living people
Alumni of the University of Dundee
People from Kavango Region
SWAPO politicians